The North Broad Street Residential Historic District is an  historic district in Winder, Georgia.  It was listed on the National Register of Historic Places in 1984 and includes 39 contributing buildings.

The district addresses historic buildings from the 1890s to 1930s;  there are also modern intrusions.

The district includes the Smith-Baxter House, built in 1902, which has a large porch, decorative scrollwork, and stained glass.  The First Baptist Church in the district is a "good example of the use of the Gothic style for a church."  The majority of houses are Bungalow style.  The district is also significant for its residential landscape architecture.

References

External links

Historic districts on the National Register of Historic Places in Georgia (U.S. state)
National Register of Historic Places in Barrow County, Georgia